Chahar or Chakhar may refer to:

Sino-Mongolian uses
 Chahar Mongols, a Mongol tribe
 Chakhar Mongolian (Chakhar), a Mongolian dialect spoken by the Chahar tribe
 Chahar Province, a former province of China named after them
 Chahar Right Front Banner, in Inner Mongolia, China
 Chahar Right Middle Banner, in Inner Mongolia, China
 Chahar Right Back Banner, in Inner Mongolia, China

Afghan uses
 Aymāq, a Persian-speaking nomadic people of Afghanistan originally known as chahar
 Chahar Bolak District, a district in Afghanistan
 Khani Chahar Bagh District, a district in Afghanistan

Iranian/Persian uses
 Charbagh, a style of Persian garden
 Charbagh, Isfahan ("Four Gardens"), an avenue in Isfahan, Iran
 Chaharbagh School, a 16th-17th century cultural complex in Isfahan, Iran
 Chaharmahal and Bakhtiari Province, a province of Iran

Other uses
 Çahar (Chakhar), Azerbaijan, a village

See also
 Chahar Suq (disambiguation)
 Chakar (disambiguation)
 Shahar (disambiguation)

Language and nationality disambiguation pages